Chợ Rã is a township (Thị trấn) and capital town of Ba Bể District, Bắc Kạn Province, in Vietnam.

Populated places in Bắc Kạn province
Communes of Bắc Kạn province
District capitals in Vietnam
Townships in Vietnam